Rilke: After The Fire is a poem from Seamus Heaney's 2006 collection District and Circle.
The poem is a translation of Rainer Maria Rilke's "Die Brandstätte", from the 1908 edition of Neue Gedichte. It recounts the morning after a fire which has consumed a home, leaving "emptiness behind / Scorched linden trees". When "the son of the place" appears on the scene, he uses a stick to drag "an out-of-shape old can or kettle" from the wreckage, and attempts to tell the others present about his loss. The poem concludes with his realising that "he [is] changed: a foreigner among them". There is one other Rilke translation in District and Circle called "Rilke: The Apple Orchard".

References

External links 
Paul Hurt discusses Heaney's Rilke translations and compares them with his own.
Alan Tucker's translation of "Die Brandstätte".

Poetry by Rainer Maria Rilke
German poems
Poetry by Seamus Heaney
Irish poetry
2006 poems
Rainer Maria Rilke